Lala Pipo: A Lot of People is a 2005 Japanese novel by Hideo Okuda. It was made into a movie by the same name in 2009. Lala Pipo is the directorial debut of Masayuki Miyano. The screenplay was written by Tetsuya Nakashima, writer-director of Kamikaze Girls and Memories of Matsuko.

The novel and movie both chronicle the life of six people involved with the Japanese porn industry. The book is divided into 6 chapters, with each chapter telling the story of one character.

The book is distributed by Vertical, Inc., and the movie is distributed by Third Window Films in the UK.

References

External links
 

2009 directorial debut films
2009 films
Films about pornography
Films based on Japanese novels
Japanese drama films
Novels about pornography
Vertical (publisher) titles
2009 Japanese novels
2000s Japanese films